Nia Roberts (born 5 July 1972) is a Welsh actress. She is married to director Marc Evans.

Biography
The youngest of three girls, Roberts was born and brought up in Brecon, Powys. Her first language is Welsh, and she attended Brecon's Welsh-medium primary school Ysgol-y-Bannau from 1975 to 1983. Her family were active members of the Brecon Little Theatre amateur dramatics group, and aged seven she first trod the boards. Five years later, she landed her first television role as the lead girl in "The Farm", a 30-minute Jackanory play for BBC1.

After gaining ten GCSEs and three A Levels, she also joined the National Youth Theatre of Wales. She then studied acting at Birmingham University, where she passed with distinction.

Career
Roberts' big break came in 1998, when she appeared in Solomon a Gaenor opposite Ioan Gruffudd. With dialogue in Welsh and Yiddish, the movie won Best Film at the 2000 Verona Film Festival and was nominated for Best Foreign Language Film at the 72nd Academy Awards.

Her subsequent Welsh-language credits include Fondue, Rhyw a Deinosors!, Newes of the Weeke, Y Palmant Aur, Glan Hafren, the long-running soap opera Pobol y Cwm, and S4C's gangster drama Y Pris. Roberts'  English-language television credits include the comedy series Dr. Terrible's House of Horrible, the drama Border Café, and several single-episode appearances in prime-time British shows such as The Bill and Casualty.

Roberts has starred in two films directed by her husband, Marc Evans: Snow Cake (2006), a drama focused on the friendship between a high-functioning autistic woman and a man who is traumatized after a fatal car accident; and Patagonia (2009), a drama set in Y Wladfa, Argentina. In 2009, Roberts also starred as registrar Mary Finch in Crash!, a hospital drama commissioned by BBC Wales and produced by Tony Jordan.

In 2010, Roberts guest-starred in the two-part Doctor Who Series 5 episode "The Hungry Earth/Cold Blood". More big-screen productions followed: She appeared in Hattie Dalton's Third Star (2010) and in Vertigo Films' The Facility (2012), an atmospheric, micro-budget horror film about volunteers fighting for their lives after a drug trial goes wrong.

In 2014, Roberts appeared in the fourth episode of Y Gwyll (Hinterland), a highly acclaimed noir detective series shot in both Welsh and English.

Personal life
Roberts, her husband, and their daughter, Edith, live in Cardiff.
She is a supporter of Plaid Cymru.

Filmography

Film

Television

References

External links

Personal website

Bio at BBC Mid-Wales

1972 births
Living people
People from Brecon
Alumni of the University of Birmingham
Welsh stage actresses
Welsh television actresses
Welsh-speaking actors